Diplomatic relations between Argentina and Ukraine, have existed for decades. The importance of relations centers on the history of Ukrainian migration to Argentina. Ukrainians in Argentina form the second largest Ukrainian community in Latin America (after Brazil) numbering approximately 250,000 Ukrainians and their descendants. Both nations are members of the World Trade Organization.

History
Between 1897 and 1914, the first wave of Ukrainians arrived to Argentina with approximately 10,000 Ukrainians immigrating to the South American nation. Soon after World War I, approximately 70,000 Ukrainians immigrated to Argentina. In February 1921, Argentina became the first and only country in Latin America to recognize and establish diplomatic relations with Ukraine. In 1922, Ukraine lost its independence and became part of the Soviet Union. Soon after World War II, an additional 6,000 Ukrainians immigrated to Argentina.

On 5 December 1991, Argentina recognized the independence of Ukraine after the Dissolution of the Soviet Union. On 6 January 1992, Argentina and Ukraine established diplomatic relations. In 1993, both nations opened embassies in each other's respective capitals. In 1995, Ukrainian President Leonid Kuchma paid an official visit to Argentina. In 1998, Argentine President Carlos Menem paid an official visit to Ukraine.

During the Annexation of Crimea by the Russian Federation in February–March 2014, Argentina as a non-permanent member of the United Nations Security Council, voted on a draft resolution condemning the 2014 referendum in Crimea. In March 2014, Argentina abstained from the vote for the United Nations General Assembly Resolution 68/262 entitled "Territorial integrity of Ukraine". The government of former Argentine President Cristina Fernández de Kirchner stated there were 'double standards' by the United Kingdom and the United States for condemning the referendum in Crimea but supporting the referendum in the Falkland Islands. Argentina has called for the "integrity of Ukraine" and believes that Crimea should be returned to Ukraine.

In September 2016, Argentine President Mauricio Macri and Ukrainian President Petro Poroshenko met during the United Nations General Assembly in New York City. In 2016, both nations celebrated 25 years since re-establishing diplomatic relations.

Invasion of Ukraine

As part of assistance during the 2022 invasion of Ukraine, Argentina has sent twelve shipments of humanitarian aid directly to Ukraine.

In February 2023, the Argentinian foreign ministry said in a statement "Argentina reaffirms its commitment to the principles of sovereignty and territorial integrity of states and human rights, permanent pillars of our country's foreign policy, it rejects the use of force as a mechanism to resolve conflicts and, in this way, reiterates its condemnation of Russia's invasion of Ukrainian territory."

High-level visits

Presidential visits from Argentina to Ukraine
 President Carlos Menem (1998)

Presidential visits from Ukraine to Argentina
 President Leonid Kuchma (1995)

Bilateral agreements
Both nations have signed several bilateral agreements such as an Agreement on the Protection of Investments (1995); Agreement on Trade and Economic Cooperation (1996); Treaty on Friendly Relations and Cooperation (2000); Agreement on Abolition of Visas (2011) and an Agreement for mutual recognition of higher education degrees from both nations (2015).

Trade

In 2016, trade between Argentina and Ukraine totaled US$60.5 million. Argentina's main exports to Ukraine include: fish and crustaceans; fruit and nuts; seeds and oleaginous fruits; tobacco and its substitutes. Ukraine's main exports to Argentina include: fertilizers, ferrous metals and machinery. Argentine multinational company Molinos Río de la Plata operates in Ukraine.

Diplomatic missions
 Argentina has an embassy in Kyiv.
 Ukraine has an embassy in Buenos Aires.

See also
 Foreign relations of Argentina
 Foreign relations of Ukraine
 Ukrainian Argentines

References 

 
Ukraine
Argentina